Alabanooru also spelled as Alabanur is a village in the Sindhanur taluk of Raichur district in the Indian state of Karnataka. Alabanur is located on Sindhanur-Olaballari road.

See also
Maski
Olaballari
Raichur
Sindhanur

References

External links
 http://Raichur.nic.in/
https://censusindia.gov.in/

Villages in Raichur district